Domenica "Nikka" Costa (born 4 June 1972) is an American singer whose music combines elements of pop, soul, and blues. She also had a career as a child singer starting in the early 1980s. She is the daughter of music producer Don Costa.

Early life
Nikka Costa was born in Tokyo, Japan. Her father, Don Costa, was a producer and musician. During her childhood, Costa was surrounded by famous musicians and traveled around the world with her father.

At age five, Costa recorded a single with Hawaiian singer Don Ho. Italian producers, Danny B. Besquet and Tony Renis, were working with her father on the album Don Costa Plays the Beatles when they had a brainstorm to produce an album with Nikka singing, while her father played acoustic guitar. The album was well received in Europe and Costa became known as a child star. At age 9, Costa sang with Frank Sinatra in an appearance on the lawn of the White House.

Costa's career as a recording artist under her own name started in 1981, when she recorded the song "(Out Here) On My Own" (from the movie Fame). The single reached No. 72 in Germany, No. 7 in Switzerland, No. 32 in the Netherlands, No. 13 in the Flanders region of Belgium., and No. 1 in Italy. The album Nikka Costa was released outside the U.S. in 1981. Costa toured the world. Her second album Fairy Tales (cuentos de hadas) was released in 1983. Don Costa died of a heart attack shortly after the album was recorded. The pop album Here I Am... Yes, It's Me was released to fulfill a contractual obligation in 1989.

After graduating from high school, Costa decided to move away from pop and moved toward funk and soul, becoming influenced by Motown artists.

Adult career
While already a music business veteran, in the early 1990s, Costa transitioned away from childhood pop to mature soul. She married Australian producer/songwriter Justin Stanley and moved to his country. (Costa and Stanley now have a daughter named Sugar McQueen.) While in Australia, Costa began writing her own songs and formed a "happy funk" band called Little Mona & the Shag Daddies, which broke up after four gigs in Sydney. Costa's next venture was a band called Sugarbone, which toured Australia in 1994. Costa describes the experience as "It was really scary to unveil it, but the reaction was good. It helped my confidence." After Sugarbone, she signed to the Mushroom label in Australia. In 1996, Costa released the album Butterfly Rocket in Australia. The record led to a nomination for ARIA Music Awards Breakthrough Artist in 1996 and Best Female Artist in 1997.

In 2000, Costa's song "Like a Feather" was featured in a Tommy Hilfiger television advertising campaign. That exposure coupled with the track's music video helped launch her U.S. music career. The album Everybody Got Their Something was released in 2001 and reached No. 120 on the Billboard 200. The title track and "Like a Feather" were radio hits, although the latter did peak at No. 53 in the United Kingdom. In 2002, Costa was the opening act for Britney Spears' Dream Within a Dream Tour in the US and Canada. In 2005, Costa released the album can'tneverdidnothin'. She toured with Lenny Kravitz, who also performed on the record. In 2006, she and her husband Justin Stanley recorded and performed the theme to the short-lived CBS sitcom  Courting Alex starring Jenna Elfman.

Costa was a guest singer on Mark Ronson's album Here Comes the Fuzz. Ronson has produced some of Costa's songs. Her song "Push & Pull" from the album Everybody Got Their Something is included in the soundtrack of the 2001 movie Blow starring Johnny Depp. Her song "Everybody Got Their Something", was used in the soundtrack of the 2009 movie All About Steve starring Sandra Bullock and Bradley Cooper. Her song "Stuck To You" from the album Pebble to a Pearl appeared in an episode of Grey's Anatomy in season five and in The Peanuts Movie.

Costa is currently signed with Stax Records. She released the studio album Pebble to a Pearl on 14 October 2008. In 2010, she released the single "Ching Ching Ching" in Europe. The song is notable from a genre change from soul/funk to electro-pop. The single reached No. 69 in Germany, making it Costa's first single to chart in Germany since "On My Own" in 1981. A new EP titled Pro Whoa was released in 2011. Costa co-wrote the song "Diamonds Made from Rain" on Eric Clapton's 2010 album Clapton. The album Nikka & Strings: Underneath and in Between, consisting of covers of rock standards, was released on 2 June 2017.

Discography

Nikka Costa (1981)
Fairy Tales (1983)
Here I Am... Yes, It's Me (1989)
Butterfly Rocket (1996)
Everybody Got Their Something (2001)
Can'tneverdidnothin' (2005)
Pebble to a Pearl (2008)
Nikka & Strings, Underneath and in Between (2017)

Awards and nominations

ARIA Music Awards
The ARIA Music Awards is an annual awards ceremony that recognises excellence, innovation, and achievement across all genres of Australian music. They commenced in 1987.

! 
|-
|1996
| "Master Blaster"
| ARIA Award for Breakthrough Artist - Single
| 
| 
|-
|1997
| "Get Off My Sunshine"
| ARIA Award for Best Female Artist
| 
| 
|-

References

1972 births
American expatriates in Australia
Child pop musicians
Living people
People from Beverly Hills, California
American expatriates in Japan
Singers from Los Angeles
American funk singers
American soul singers
21st-century American women singers
20th-century American women singers
20th-century American singers
21st-century American singers